Tangi Ropati (born November 15, 1984) is a former Samoa international rugby league footballer who plays for the Marist Saints in the Fox Memorial.

Background
Ropati was born in New Zealand.

Playing career
Ropati played for the Marist Richmond Brothers in the 2004 Bartercard Cup.

Ropati was signed by the Sheffield Eagles in 2009 after they spotted him in the 2008 World Cup.

Ropati joined Widnes Vikings in the 2010 close season along with Chaz I'Anson, Steve Tyrer and Macgraff Leuluai as the Vikings prepared for Super League.

Ropati was released from Widnes and in 2012 joined Championship winners Featherstone Rovers.

Featherstone Rovers
Ropati scored the opening try for Rovers against arch rivals Castleford Tigers in the Challenge Cup 4th Round tie on Saturday, 14 April 2012.

Return to New Zealand
In 2013 he was contracted to the Auckland Vulcans in the NSW Cup.

In 2014 he played for the Marist Saints in the Auckland Rugby League competition and the Akarana Falcons in the NZRL National Competition.

Representative career
Ropati played one game for Samoa in the 2008 World Cup.

In 2009 he was named as part of the Samoan side for the Pacific Cup.

References

External links

Profile at featherstonerovers.net

Living people
New Zealand sportspeople of Samoan descent
New Zealand rugby league players
Samoa national rugby league team players
Sheffield Eagles players
1984 births
Marist Richmond Brothers players
Featherstone Rovers players
Widnes Vikings players
Rugby league centres
Rugby league fullbacks
Auckland rugby league team players
New Zealand expatriate rugby league players
Expatriate rugby league players in England
New Zealand expatriate sportspeople in England
Marist Saints players